Michael Dunn is, the director of Brigham Young University's Department of Nutrition, Dietetics and Food Science. Dunn was the leader a team also including BYU students Kathryn Burton and Adam Richins that developed a way to make corn tortillas which were fortified with iron and other essential vitamins to aid the health of people who live primarily on corn tortillas, such as most children in Mexico.

Dunn worked for the International Food Network before joining the BYU faculty five years ago.

Dunn received a Ph.D. from Cornell University in 1996.

Sources 
 BYU faculty listing
 Salt Lake Tribune article on Dunn's tortilla work
 BYU newsnet article on Dunn's corn fortification project
 Daily Herald article on project
 [IDX]=348993 Agriculture Academia "Who's Who" sight listing for Dunn

Brigham Young University faculty
Cornell University College of Agriculture and Life Sciences alumni
Living people
American nutritionists
Year of birth missing (living people)